Army Men is a series of video games developed by 3DO and Global Star Software. It is based on various conflicts between four kinds of plastic army men, distinguished by their color: the Green, the Tan, the Blue, and the Grey. Two other factions, the Red and the Orange, as well as a much smaller army, the Black, also contribute to the story. Two additional factions, the Galactic Army and the Alien Army, were introduced in Army Men: Toys in Space.

History

Studio 3DO era
The idea of a strategy game using plastic army men arose from the developers' desire to avoid censorship issues with the Unterhaltungssoftware Selbstkontrolle ratings board when publishing the game in Germany. Chris Wilson, producer of the original Army Men, explained:

Army Men used cutscenes done in the style of Movietone News clips.

Global Star era
Army Men: RTS was the last Army Men game to be released by The 3DO Company before they filed for chapter eleven bankruptcy. The major franchises were auctioned off, and Army Men was purchased by Crave Entertainment.

In 2004, Global Star Software published Sarge's War. The PlayStation 2 and Xbox versions were completed by some members of the original Sarge's War development team from 3DO. Global Star then released Army Men: Major Malfunction for the Xbox and PlayStation 2, and planned a Nintendo DS version, which was not released. Both Major Malfunction and Soldiers of Misfortune were unfavorably received by critics. Army Men: Mobile Ops was released for mobile phones in 2010. The series is currently owned by 2K after buying out Global Star in 2007.

Other games 
A fan made Army Men III was under development by Neotl Empire, but was cancelled and resulted in an open source release of the unfinished game in April 2018. In December 2017, a licensed mobile game in the series was made by Volcano Force Studios under license from 2K Play under title Army Men: Strike  that incorporates characters from the Sarge's Heroes subseries.

Games

Reception
During its later years, the Army Men series was criticized by X-Play and Seanbaby of EGM, for the frequency and declining quality of each new title. The Official UK PlayStation Magazine awarded six games in the series a score of 3/10 or less.

References

External links

 
2K Games franchises
Take-Two Interactive franchises
Video game franchises